The 1938 Hupmobile Evanair-Conditioner, together with the concurrent Nash Weather Eye, were the automobile industry's first fresh-air hot water heating systems. Kelch fresh-air exhaust heaters had been available on Packard automobiles for several years prior to the introduction of these systems.

The Evanair-Conditioner, unlike the Weather Eye, was mounted entirely within the engine compartment, and the hot-water control switch was mounted on the dashboard. The very similar Weather Eye drew air in through a cowl ventilator, then filtered and heated the air in a unit mounted beneath or within the dashboard.

The then-revolutionary principles of both the Hupmobile Evanair-Conditioner and the Nash Weather Eye are still in use today in nearly every motor vehicle.

Auto parts
Hupmobile
Heaters